Sinch is the first major label release created by the American alternative metal group Sinch, which the band made shortly after being signed to Roadrunner Records.

Featuring a deliberately abrasive yet also melodic sound, the album notably includes "Something More", the band's first major single.

Background and inspiration
The album was produced by Malcolm Springer. He had previously done producing work for bands such as Full Devil Jacket, Matchbox 20, and Collective Soul in the 2000s and late 1990s. Springer also contributed to the album in other ways such as making string arrangements and playing a Wurlitzer.

Reviews and reception
Music critic Jason D. Taylor, writing for the Allmusic, gave the release a mixed to positive review. He argued, "Sinch experiments with hidden samples and awkward vocal tricks to keep the listener unprepared for the next leap into the unknown, and they do a satisfiable job at holding one's attention throughout the remainder of the album." He added that, while seeming "unfocused" and somewhat weak in certain areas, their alternative rock influenced sound can rise beyond contemporaries such as Creed and Default, particularly praising the single "Something More" as a "goldmine".

Track listing
All tracks composed by Jamie Stem.

See also

2002 in music

References

Sinch (band) albums
2002 albums
Roadrunner Records albums